Elections to Wigan Council were held on 3 May 1979, with one third of the council up for vote as well as an extra vacancy in Ward 22. The election seen Labour strengthening their grip, with six gains - mostly in the wards they lost seats in at the 1975 election - and one loss. All but one of the gains were from the Conservatives, with the other being from the Liberal's sole seat in Ward 14. A Liberal gain in Ward 15 from Labour kept them represented on the council. Owing to general election on the same day, turnout was significantly up, to 75.7% and all wards were contested - a continuation of the feat started last election.

Election result

This result had the following consequences for the total number of seats on the Council after the elections:

Ward results

References

1979 English local elections
1979
1970s in Greater Manchester